Unstrut-Hainich-Kreis II is an electoral constituency (German: Wahlkreis) represented in the Landtag of Thuringia. It elects one member via first-past-the-post voting. Under the current constituency numbering system, it is designated as constituency 9. It covers the central, southern, and eastern part of Unstrut-Hainich-Kreis.

Unstrut-Hainich-Kreis II was created for the 1994 state election. Since 2019, it has been represented by Lars Schütze of Alternative for Germany (AfD).

Geography
As of the 2019 state election, Unstrut-Hainich-Kreis II covers the central, southern, and eastern part of Unstrut-Hainich-Kreis, specifically the municipalities of Bad Langensalza, Bad Tennstedt, Ballhausen, Blankenburg, Bothenheilingen, Bruchstedt, Großvargula, Haussömmern, Herbsleben, Hornsömmern, Issersheilingen, Kammerforst, Kirchheilingen, Kleinwelsbach, Körner, Kutzleben, Marolterode, Mittelsömmern, Mühlhausen/Thüringen (without Bollstedt, Grabe, Höngeda and Seebach), Neunheilingen, Obermehler, Oppershausen, Schlotheim, Schönstedt, Sundhausen, Tottleben, Unstrut-Hainich, Urleben, and Vogtei.

Members
The constituency was held by the Christian Democratic Union (CDU) from its creation in 1994 until 2019, during which time it was represented by Peter Bonitz (1994–2004) and Annette Lehmann (2004–2019). It was won by Alternative for Germany in 2019, and is represented by Lars Schütze.

Election results

2019 election

2014 election

2009 election

2004 election

1999 election

1994 election

References

Electoral districts in Thuringia
1994 establishments in Germany
Unstrut-Hainich-Kreis
Constituencies established in 1994